sinar (formerly known as Sinar FM)  is a Malaysian Malay-language radio station operated by Astro Holdings Sdn Bhd. The radio station began broadcasting on 1 March 2004. The radio station focused on mature listeners and plays classic music from both local and foreign artists, compared to its sister station, ERA, Gegar and zayan), which target younger and East Coast listeners, respectively. In 2015, as according to Nielsen RAM Survey Wave #1, Sinar maintained its position as Malaysia's second leading Malay-language station with over 3.7 million listeners.

Since the station launched at 1 March 2004, Sinar mostly plays classic hits and adult contemporary from the 1980s to today for targeting listeners between the age of 25 to 39.

Frequency

Internet radio 
Broadcast online on SYOK website and APP
Sinar Irama 70'
Sinar Irama 80'
Sinar i-Muzik
Sinar Iramalaysia
Sinar Jiwang
Sinar Pop Yeh Yeh
Sinar Rock Kapak
Sinar Sinema

Television satellite 
 Astro (television): Channel 857

Gallery

References

External links
 
 Listen Sinar FM online

2004 establishments in Malaysia
Radio stations established in 2004
Radio stations in Malaysia
Malay-language radio stations
Mass media in Kuala Lumpur